Detay (Detail) is the third studio album released in 1998 by Turkish pop singer Mustafa Sandal.

Track listing

Personnel 
Mustafa Sandal, Bülent Tezcan – music direction
Deneb Pinjo – mixing
Prestij Müzik – publishing
Koray Kasap – photography

Music videos 
 "Aya Benzer"
 "Detay"
 "Çekilin"
 "Mevcut"

References 

Mustafa Sandal albums
1998 albums